The Messer Group GmbH is a supplier of industrial gases. Business is focused on 30 European and Asian countries. The company headquarters are located in Bad Soden (Germany). The managing director of the family company is Stefan Messer, grandson of the company founder.

Messer is selling gases for industrial use like oxygen, nitrogen, argon, carbon dioxide, hydrogen, helium, shielding gases and gases for medical use.

History
In 1898, a student, Adolf Messer founded a company for acetylene lamps in Frankfurt Höchst.
With the emerging of electrical lighting the company changed its business towards welding.

The company merged in 1965, with Knapsack Griesheim AG to form the new Messer Griesheim GmbH. After this merger Farbwerke Hoechst held two-thirds of the company shares.

Between 1997 and 2004, the gas and welding-related divisions were bought back by the Messer Family creating the current Messer Group GmbH. The company subsidiaries for Germany, UK and the US were sold to Air Liquide, including a four-year Non-compete clause for the Messer Group. After the expiration of the non-compete clause in 2008, the Messer Group GmbH began selling gases for industrial use in these countries again. Messer Tehnogas AD have production sites in seven cities in Serbia – Belgrade, Novi Sad, Bor, Niš, Pančevo, Smederevo and Kraljevo.

In 2019, Messer acquired the right to operate in North America and in South America as a result of the Linde-Praxair merger. Regulator approval required the divestment of these rights. Messer began operating the United States, Canada, Brazil, Colombia, and Chile.

References

External links
 Official website
 Messer Cutting Systems GmbH

Chemical companies of Germany
Companies based in Hesse
Industrial gases
German companies established in 1898
Chemical companies established in 1898